Ludvík Daněk (6 January 1937 – 16 November 1998) was a Czechoslovak discus thrower, who won the gold medal at the 1972 Olympic Games with a throw of 64.40 m (211'3").

Daněk was born in Blansko, and competed in four Summer Olympics for Czechoslovakia, winning silver in 1964 Olympics, bronze in 1968 Olympics and gold in 1972 Olympics. He set three world records in discus throw, of 64.55 m in 1964, 65.22 m in 1965 and of 66.07 m in 1966. He also won several medals at the European Athletics Championships. He was the gold medallist at the 1971 European Athletics Championships and was the silver medallist three years later at the 1974 European Athletics Championships.

After retiring from competitions Daněk became a sports administrator, and served as vice-president of the Czech athletics federation. The location where he set his first world record in 1964 is now celebrated with a memorial circle, and the venue in Turnov is now called the Ludvík Daněk Stadium. He died in Hutisko-Solanec near Vsetín, aged 61. Since 1999, the year following his death, the stadium has hosted an annual track and field meeting in his honour – the Ludvík Daněk Memorial.

Major competitions

 1964: Olympic Games: 2nd place (60.52)
 1966: European Championships: 5th place (56.24)
 1968: Olympic Games: 3rd place (62.92)
 1969: European Championships: 4th place (59.30)
 1971: European Championships: 1st place (63.90)
 1972: Olympic Games: 1st place (64.40)
 1974: European Championships: 2nd place (62.76)
 1976: Olympic Games: 9th place (61.28)

References

1937 births
1998 deaths
People from Blansko
Czech male discus throwers
Czechoslovak male discus throwers
World record setters in athletics (track and field)
Olympic athletes of Czechoslovakia
Athletes (track and field) at the 1964 Summer Olympics
Athletes (track and field) at the 1968 Summer Olympics
Athletes (track and field) at the 1972 Summer Olympics
Athletes (track and field) at the 1976 Summer Olympics
Olympic bronze medalists for Czechoslovakia
Olympic silver medalists for Czechoslovakia
Olympic gold medalists for Czechoslovakia
European Athletics Championships medalists
Medalists at the 1972 Summer Olympics
Medalists at the 1968 Summer Olympics
Medalists at the 1964 Summer Olympics
Olympic gold medalists in athletics (track and field)
Olympic silver medalists in athletics (track and field)
Olympic bronze medalists in athletics (track and field)
Sportspeople from the South Moravian Region